Reggie Mixes In, also known as Facing the Music, is an American 1916 silent action/comedy-drama film starring Douglas Fairbanks and directed by Christy Cabanne. The film was produced by Fine Arts Film Company and distributed by Triangle Film Corporation. The film is extant and in the public domain.

Plot 

Wealthy Reggie Morton (Fairbanks) falls in love with Agnes Shannon (Love), a dancer on the Bowery, and takes a job as a bouncer to be near her. His rival is Tony Bernard (Lowery), the leader of a gang, whose henchmen attack Reggie. Reggie fights them off, and then fights the gang leader in an empty warehouse to determine the winner of Agnes's love.

Cast

Production 
The working title for the film was The Bouncer. The film was predominantly made in a studio, although some scenes were filmed in Newport in Orange County in 1916.

Reception 
Douglas Fairbanks received positive reviews for his performance, while Bessie Love's reviews were mixed.

References

External links 

 
 
 
 
 

1910s action comedy-drama films
1916 films
American action comedy-drama films
American black-and-white films
American silent feature films
Films directed by Christy Cabanne
Films set in Manhattan
Films shot in California
Surviving American silent films
Triangle Film Corporation films
1916 comedy films
1916 drama films
1910s American films
Silent action films
1910s English-language films
Silent American comedy-drama films